Alain Bertrand (23 February 1951 – 3 March 2020) was a French politician. Born in Saint-Juéry, Tarn, he was originally a member of the Socialist Party before switching to LREM. At the time of his death, Bertrand had served as the Senate's representative of the Lozère department since 2012. He was mayor of Mende from 2008 to 2016. He also previously served as the vice-president of the regional council of Languedoc-Roussillon from 2004 to 2011.

On 3 March 2020, Bertrand died in Mende of an unspecified illness, at the age of 69.

References

External links

Alain Bertrand profile

1951 births
2020 deaths
21st-century French politicians
French Senators of the Fifth Republic
La République En Marche! politicians
Mayors of places in Occitania (administrative region)
People from Tarn (department)
Senators of Lozère
Socialist Party (France) politicians